The following is a list of Chinese films first released in 2012. There were 231 Chinese feature films released in China in 2012.

Highest-grossing films
These are the top 10 grossing Chinese films that were released in China in 2012:

2012

January – March

April – June

July – September

October – December

See also
2012 in China

References

External links
IMDb list of Chinese films

2012
Films
Lists of 2012 films by country or language